Horrigan is a surname. Notable people with the surname include:

Alfred F. Horrigan (1914–2005), American academic and university founder
Bryan Horrigan (born 1962), Australian legal academic
Darren Horrigan (born 1983), English footballer
Jack Horrigan (1925–1973), American sportswriter
Liam Horrigan, Irish rugby league player

See also
6176 Horrigan, a main-belt asteroid